Sir William Borlase's Grammar School (commonly shortened to Borlase or SWBGS) is a selective state grammar school accepting pupils of all genders aged 11–18 located in Marlow, Buckinghamshire, England. It is situated on West Street, close to the town centre and also accepts students from nearby towns. It has around 1000 pupils, including a sixth form of about 380.

History

Foundation
The School was founded on its present site in 1624 by Sir William Borlase in memory of his son Henry Borlase, MP for Marlow, who died in that year.

Sir William Borlase
Sir William Borlase was the son of John Borlase, who made his fortune in London and this enabled his son to establish himself in Marlow as a country gentleman. He lived at Westhorpe Manor House in Little Marlow and became, not only Sheriff of Buckinghamshire, but was a Member of Parliament for Aylesbury. In 1603 he was knighted by King James I. In 1624 and in memory of his son Henry who died that same year, Sir William decided to build a "free school" in the town in order "to teach twenty-four poor children to write, read and cast accounts, such as their parents and friends are not able to maintain at school". Boys entered the school between the ages of ten and fourteen and at the end of two years, six of the best were given two pounds each to apprentice themselves to a trade.

Co-education
In 1987 the school became co-educational when girls entered into the lower sixth.

Specialist status
In September 2005 the school was awarded specialist school status as a Performing Arts College, by the Department for Education and Skills (DfES).

Academy status
In June 2011 the school became an Academy.

Awards and inspections
As well as its performing arts status, the school holds a number of awards and marks including the Sportsmark Award, the NACE Challenge Award, the Healthy Schools mark, the Continuing Professional Development Mark and is designated as a National Support School.

The most recent full Ofsted inspection (as of Autumn 2014) occurred in June 2012. The report noted that the school has "an inspirational learning culture which is embraced by staff and students". Borlase was judged to be an 'Outstanding' school.

Headteachers
1624 – Smith
1624–1721 – records destroyed
1721–1735 – Roe
1735–1759 – Thomas Heather I
1759–1782 – William Heather
1782–1793 – Thomas Heather II
1793–1809 – H. H. Gower
1809–1814 – Stephen Gage
1814–1835 – William Francis
1835–1844 – George Gale
1844–1850 – Charles Wethered
1850–1880 – Edwin Segrave
1881–1895 – M. Graves
1896–1901 – E. W. Clarke
1901–1904 – E. H. Blakeney
1904–1927 – A. J. Skinner
1927–1956 – W. S. Booth
1956–1974 – E. M. Hazelton
1974–1988 – R. R. Smith
1988–1988 – D. C. W. Banner
1989–1997 – L. A. Smy
1997–1998 – Adrienne Crittenden
1998–2017 – Peter Holding
2018–present – Kay Mountfield

Physical layout

The school has a collection of facilities of varying vintages. The school office and reprographics room is housed in the original flint building, which was unveiled in 1624. Since then the school has added a Victorian cloister, and an Edwardian era Chapel.

In the 1970s further expansion occurred. A new school hall and several classrooms were built.

In the late 1980s a new sports gym was added, followed in 1992 by new modern languages facilities and library in a new building facing onto West Street.

In 2000, after the school started admitting Year 7s, the "Audrey Moore Building" (named after its chief benefactor) was built to house new classrooms, a sixth-form common room and a new canteen, replacing the old sports pavilion and canteen.

In 2004, as part of the school's bid for Arts Award status, a new performing arts theatre was built on the site of the old swimming pool. The building also houses purpose-built IT labs and metal and woodwork facilities. It was opened on 7 December 2004 by the Duke of Gloucester. As a result of this building work, other space within the school was adjusted with a rolling programme, and a new style eatery called "Mimi's Café" was added, along with a new Sixth Form Centre. At the beginning of the 2006 Autumn term, the headmaster announced that the Library was to be renamed the "Learning Centre".

At the end of the 2010 summer holidays, the school started building a new cookery building on the area where the decking once stood, this was completed in 2011 with the addition of an English room above the kitchens.

In September 2016, a new building was opened on the site of the old locker room. This new building houses 3 Sixth Form workrooms, Sixth Form mentoring offices and a new maths classroom

Coat of arms

The school coat of arms is emblazoned on all school literature and on the school uniform. Originally, the Taillefers of Angoulême had a crest of a ghostly hand emerging from a cloud. It is holding a badelaire to give one power in a struggle, be it sporting or academic. Behind this, on the background, can be seen eight stars.
The school also has a secondary maxim 'offer the helping hand' that has been developed in the past century.

House system

Sir William Borlase's Grammar School has six houses: Britons, Danes, Normans, Romans, Saxons and Vikings. They are named after the various ancient national groups that held power in Britain. Pupils have coloured stripes on their ties indicating the house that they are in.

Houses form the basis of the tutoring system at Borlase with each house comprising eight tutor groups.

There are various house competitions throughout the academic year ranging from the triannual music, drama and dance competitions to cross-country and sports day and public speaking and mathematics.

Academic societies and clubs
The school hosts a number of different academic societies and clubs. These all have vocational links and are usually run by Year 12 or 13 pupils with an advisory teacher attached.

Arts 

Music, drama and dance are studied by all in Key Stage 3 and can be continued throughout student's GCSE and A-level years.

Drama
The school puts on a Junior Musical and Senior Production on alternating years with other drama opportunities occurring throughout the school year. Recent senior productions have included Fiddler on the Roof and Dr Faustus. The school recently put on a production of Les Misérables.

Music
The school hosts concerts. Musical groups include Jazz band, Big Band, Ukulele orchestra, Brass Concert Band and Junior Wind Band.

Sport
The Sir William Borlase's Grammar School Boat Club has had members reaching international events. It is open to all students from Year 9 onwards.  Sir William Borlase's Grammar School won the Fawley Challenge Cup at Henley Royal Regatta in 2012, 2014 and 2015. In 2014, the J16's pre-qualified for the Princess Elizabeth Cup at Henley; the Princess Elizabeth is a J18's event.

Borlase Hockey club has over 200 members. The club is based at Marlow Sports Club.

A major sport during the Autumn term, the rugby scheme starts at Year 7.

Notable former pupils

 Richard Britnell – Professor of History at the University of Durham from 1997 to 2003
 Tony Culyer CBE – health economist, professor and deputy vice-chancellor at York (UK) and professor at University of Toronto
 Tom Dean – swimmer, Olympic gold medalist at Tokyo 2020
 Tom Guest – Harlequins rugby union player
 Lieutenant B. A. Horsfall – recipient of the Victoria Cross
 Ken Snakehips Johnson – bandleader, jazz artist 
 Philip Lee – Conservative MP for Bracknell 2010–2019
 Hugh Walpole - novelist
 Garry Weston – inventor of Wagon Wheels snack food and chief executive of Associated British Foods from 1969 to 1999

Footnotes

References

External links
Department for Education Performance Tables 2011
 EduBase

Grammar schools in Buckinghamshire
1624 establishments in England
Educational institutions established in the 1620s
Marlow, Buckinghamshire
Academies in Buckinghamshire
Grade II* listed buildings in Buckinghamshire